Mounkaïla Aïssata is a Nigerien politician. At one time the only female member of parliament, Aïssata is also a member of the Pan-African Parliament. In the Pan-African Parliament, she is a member of the Committee on Gender, Family, Youth and People with Disability.

References

 Vast Political Gains for Women in Niger – From a lone voice to fourteen ACPSP: Gender Equality Network

Year of birth missing (living people)
Living people
Members of the National Assembly (Niger)
Members of the Pan-African Parliament from Niger
Women members of the National Assembly (Niger)
21st-century women politicians
Women members of the Pan-African Parliament